Kaaval Dheivam is a 1969 Indian Tamil-language drama film, directed by K. Vijayan and produced by S. V. Subbaiah. An adaptation of the novel Kai Vilangu by Jayakanthan, the film stars Sivakumar, Sowcar Janaki, Lakshmi and Nagesh in lead roles while Sivaji Ganesan makes a special appearance. The film was a moderate success at box-office. The film was remade in Kannada as Devara Mane (1985).

Plot 
Aanaikundram Jail. Superintendent K. Raghavan is a man of integrity and humaneness who views the 500 inmates as 500 books that need to be perused. He stays with his wife Alamu in the bungalow adjoining the penitentiary, and the childless couple treats the prisoners with compassion and love, for they look upon the inmates as the children they never had. Chamundi who is serving a life sentence for killing one of the 2 villains who had fatally molested his teenage daughter Sivakami.

In the nearby Allikkulam village lives Manickam- an honest, hardworking youth who is the leaseholder of Raghavan's lands. Manickam and Kokila love each other. The scoundrel Marimuthu, an unwelcome suitor of Kokila, sees his dreams of marrying Kokila coming to nought, and schemes with his accomplices to harm Manickam. They spy Manickam and Kokila singing and romancing, and this increases their ire. Marimuthu accosts Manickam near the Aiyanaar statue. When Marimuthu speaks deprecatingly of Manickam's lineage, Manickam sees red. He plucks the sword from the hands of the Aiyanaar statue and injures Marimuthu. Manickam is arrested and sentenced to 5 years imprisonment. Superintendent Raghavan consoles him and treats him with kindness. With the unusual backdrop of a prison, original story author JK endows each character with an interesting history and subtle idiosyncrasies.

The story then captures the interesting events in the prison. Of particular interest are the sequences that involve Chamundi. Chamundi sees the other man who was responsible for his daughter's death as an inmate in the prison and manages to hack him to death one night. For this crime, Chamundi is sentenced to death, and the death sentence is carried out. In the meantime, Manickam gets the news that his mother is seriously unwell. He grieves for her and longs to pay her a visit. On his own accord Superintendent Raghavan takes the unprecedented step of permitting Manickam to go to Allikulam to see his mother, after eliciting a promise from him that he would return to the prison by daybreak. The next day is Raghavan's last day in service, and Raman Nair arrives to take charge as the new superintendent. Manickam has not yet returned, and Raman Nair refuses to take charge until the headcount tallies with the roster. Raghavan is confident that Manickam will return, and his confidence is not misplaced. Manickam arrives just in the nick of time. Raghavan retires; his honour and reputation untarnished.

Cast 
Sivaji Ganesan as Samundi (Extended cameo)
Sivakumar as Manickam
Lakshmi as Gokila
R. Muthuraman as Saiyathu Bai
S. V. Subbaiah as Raghavan
Sowcar Janaki as Alamel
Sriranjani Jr. as Rangamma
M. N. Nambiar as Raman Nayar
S. A. Ashokan as Marimuthu
O. A. K. Thevar as Mioner
V. Gopalakrishnan as the head of police
T. S. Balaiah as Sangili Pillai
V. K. Ramasamy as Subbaiya Pillai
Nagesh as Kesavan
G. Sakunthala as Poongavanam
Usilai Mani as Panchayat Kambathukarar
Kuladeivam Rajagopal as Villupattu Singer's
Shanmugasundari as Villupattu Singer's
Karuppu Subbiah as Jail Wanted
K. Kannan as Sundaramoorthy

Production 
After acting in several films, S. V. Subbaiah decided to venture into production. He chose to adapt Kai Vilangu, a novel of Jayakanthan; the film adaptation would be titled Kaaval Deivam. Ganesan who appeared in a cameo appearance completed his portions for five days in between the schedules of Uyarndha Manithan upon M. Saravanan's permission.

Soundtrack 
The soundtrack was composed by G. Devarajan, while the lyrics were written by Mayavanathan, Thanjai Vaanan & Nellai Arulmani.

Release and reception 
Kaaval Dheivam was released on 1 May 1969. Ananda Vikatan, in a review dated 8 June 1969, praised the film for its story and the cast performances. The Indian Express in its review dated 3 May 1969 called it "a conventional picture and a departure from the usual Tamil film" and concluded "The technical side is not an asset to the film but despite these drawbacks, it is a warmly recommendable family picture".

References

Bibliography

External links 
 

1960s Tamil-language films
1969 directorial debut films
1969 films
Films based on Indian novels
Films directed by K. Vijayan
Films scored by G. Devarajan
Films set in prison
Indian black-and-white films
Indian drama films
Tamil films remade in other languages